The 1972 VFL season was the 76th season of the Victorian Football League (VFL), the highest level senior Australian rules football competition in Victoria. The season featured twelve clubs, ran from 1 April until 7 October, and comprised a 22-game home-and-away season followed by a finals series featuring the top five clubs – an increase from the four clubs which had contested the finals in previous years.

The premiership was won by the Carlton Football Club for the eleventh time, after it defeated  by 27 points in the 1972 VFL Grand Final.

Premiership season
In 1972, the VFL competition consisted of twelve teams of 18 on-the-field players each, plus two substitute players, known as the 19th man and the 20th man. A player could be substituted for any reason; however, once substituted, a player could not return to the field of play under any circumstances.

Teams played each other in a home-and-away season of 22 rounds; matches 12 to 22 were the "home-and-way reverse" of matches 1 to 11.

Once the 22 round home-and-away season had finished, the 1972 VFL Premiers were determined by the specific format and conventions of the McIntyre final five system.

Round 1

|- bgcolor="#CCCCFF"
| Home team
| Home team score
| Away team
| Away team score
| Venue
| Crowd
| Date
|- bgcolor="#FFFFFF"
| 
| 15.14 (104)
| 
| 10.15 (75)
| Glenferrie Oval
| 26,000
| 1 April 1972
|- bgcolor="#FFFFFF"
| 
| 11.15 (81)
| 
| 10.10 (70)
| Princes Park
| 32,500
| 1 April 1972
|- bgcolor="#FFFFFF"
| 
| 20.14 (134)
| 
| 11.10 (76)
| Moorabbin Oval
| 24,000
| 1 April 1972
|- bgcolor="#FFFFFF"
| 
| 10.13 (73)
| 
| 9.7 (61)
| Lake Oval
| 18,654
| 3 April 1972
|- bgcolor="#FFFFFF"
| 
| 9.13 (67)
| 
| 18.20 (128)
| Western Oval
| 28,935
| 3 April 1972
|- bgcolor="#FFFFFF"
| 
| 16.9 (105)
| 
| 14.17 (101)
| MCG
| 72,714
| 3 April 1972

Round 2

|- bgcolor="#CCCCFF"
| Home team
| Home team score
| Away team
| Away team score
| Venue
| Crowd
| Date
|- bgcolor="#FFFFFF"
| 
| 10.3 (63)
| 
| 22.17 (149)
| Kardinia Park
| 18,494
| 8 April 1972
|- bgcolor="#FFFFFF"
| 
| 12.16 (88)
| 
| 12.8 (80)
| Junction Oval
| 20,000
| 8 April 1972
|- bgcolor="#FFFFFF"
| 
| 16.11 (107)
| 
| 7.18 (60)
| Windy Hill
| 22,611
| 8 April 1972
|- bgcolor="#FFFFFF"
| 
| 11.10 (76)
| 
| 19.24 (138)
| Arden Street Oval
| 10,200
| 8 April 1972
|- bgcolor="#FFFFFF"
| 
| 11.18 (84)
| 
| 15.15 (105)
| MCG
| 21,452
| 8 April 1972
|- bgcolor="#FFFFFF"
| 
| 10.15 (75)
| 
| 11.9 (75)
| Victoria Park
| 37,070
| 8 April 1972

Round 3

|- bgcolor="#CCCCFF"
| Home team
| Home team score
| Away team
| Away team score
| Venue
| Crowd
| Date
|- bgcolor="#FFFFFF"
| 
| 17.11 (113)
| 
| 6.12 (48)
| Victoria Park
| 25,172
| 15 April 1972
|- bgcolor="#FFFFFF"
| 
| 22.7 (139)
| 
| 12.9 (81)
| Moorabbin Oval
| 20,068
| 15 April 1972
|- bgcolor="#FFFFFF"
| 
| 12.14 (86)
| 
| 16.13 (109)
| Arden Street Oval
| 10,383
| 15 April 1972
|- bgcolor="#FFFFFF"
| 
| 16.15 (111)
| 
| 19.17 (131)
| MCG
| 55,823
| 15 April 1972
|- bgcolor="#FFFFFF"
| 
| 14.10 (94)
| 
| 18.18 (126)
| Lake Oval
| 20,499
| 15 April 1972
|- bgcolor="#FFFFFF"
| 
| 9.11 (65)
| 
| 15.17 (107)
| VFL Park
| 16,347
| 15 April 1972

Round 4

|- bgcolor="#CCCCFF"
| Home team
| Home team score
| Away team
| Away team score
| Venue
| Crowd
| Date
|- bgcolor="#FFFFFF"
| 
| 18.19 (127)
| 
| 8.8 (56)
| MCG
| 18,594
| 22 April 1972
|- bgcolor="#FFFFFF"
| 
| 15.10 (100)
| 
| 12.14 (86)
| Western Oval
| 12,827
| 22 April 1972
|- bgcolor="#FFFFFF"
| 
| 11.17 (83)
| 
| 9.10 (64)
| Junction Oval
| 16,937
| 22 April 1972
|- bgcolor="#FFFFFF"
| 
| 17.27 (129)
| 
| 12.14 (86)
| Windy Hill
| 15,000
| 22 April 1972
|- bgcolor="#FFFFFF"
| 
| 15.14 (104)
| 
| 15.19 (109)
| Princes Park
| 28,536
| 22 April 1972
|- bgcolor="#FFFFFF"
| 
| 9.13 (67)
| 
| 12.15 (87)
| VFL Park
| 40,201
| 22 April 1972

Round 5

|- bgcolor="#CCCCFF"
| Home team
| Home team score
| Away team
| Away team score
| Venue
| Crowd
| Date
|- bgcolor="#FFFFFF"
| 
| 13.11 (89)
| 
| 12.12 (84)
| MCG
| 38,154
| 25 April 1972
|- bgcolor="#FFFFFF"
| 
| 10.13 (73)
| 
| 13.10 (88)
| VFL Park
| 50,502
| 25 April 1972
|- bgcolor="#FFFFFF"
| 
| 5.17 (47)
| 
| 9.16 (70)
| Lake Oval
| 19,724
| 29 April 1972
|- bgcolor="#FFFFFF"
| 
| 14.20 (104)
| 
| 11.10 (76)
| Glenferrie Oval
| 15,355
| 29 April 1972
|- bgcolor="#FFFFFF"
| 
| 11.9 (75)
| 
| 19.13 (127)
| Kardinia Park
| 16,343
| 29 April 1972
|- bgcolor="#FFFFFF"
| 
| 8.14 (62)
| 
| 22.8 (140)
| Arden Street Oval
| 17,414
| 29 April 1972

Round 6

|- bgcolor="#CCCCFF"
| Home team
| Home team score
| Away team
| Away team score
| Venue
| Crowd
| Date
|- bgcolor="#FFFFFF"
| 
| 14.12 (96)
| 
| 15.11 (101)
| Victoria Park
| 29,885
| 6 May 1972
|- bgcolor="#FFFFFF"
| 
| 22.15 (147)
| 
| 14.14 (98)
| Princes Park
| 19,073
| 6 May 1972
|- bgcolor="#FFFFFF"
| 
| 24.21 (165)
| 
| 10.16 (76)
| Moorabbin Oval
| 34,055
| 6 May 1972
|- bgcolor="#FFFFFF"
| 
| 16.16 (112)
| 
| 13.12 (90)
| Western Oval
| 18,466
| 6 May 1972
|- bgcolor="#FFFFFF"
| 
| 16.13 (109)
| 
| 12.13 (85)
| MCG
| 41,537
| 6 May 1972
|- bgcolor="#FFFFFF"
| 
| 14.22 (106)
| 
| 13.13 (91)
| VFL Park
| 9,099
| 6 May 1972

Round 7

|- bgcolor="#CCCCFF"
| Home team
| Home team score
| Away team
| Away team score
| Venue
| Crowd
| Date
|- bgcolor="#FFFFFF"
| 
| 13.14 (92)
| 
| 9.20 (74)
| Glenferrie Oval
| 13,742
| 13 May 1972
|- bgcolor="#FFFFFF"
| 
| 18.15 (123)
| 
| 10.22 (82)
| Windy Hill
| 27,875
| 13 May 1972
|- bgcolor="#FFFFFF"
| 
| 17.19 (121)
| 
| 13.16 (94)
| MCG
| 17,331
| 13 May 1972
|- bgcolor="#FFFFFF"
| 
| 15.18 (108)
| 
| 16.15 (111)
| Kardinia Park
| 16,836
| 13 May 1972
|- bgcolor="#FFFFFF"
| 
| 10.15 (75)
| 
| 15.10 (100)
| Junction Oval
| 26,766
| 13 May 1972
|- bgcolor="#FFFFFF"
| 
| 10.15 (75)
| 
| 5.8 (38)
| VFL Park
| 30,249
| 13 May 1972

Round 8

|- bgcolor="#CCCCFF"
| Home team
| Home team score
| Away team
| Away team score
| Venue
| Crowd
| Date
|- bgcolor="#FFFFFF"
| 
| 7.14 (56)
| 
| 11.14 (80)
| Victoria Park
| 25,986
| 20 May 1972
|- bgcolor="#FFFFFF"
| 
| 20.14 (134)
| 
| 14.17 (101)
| MCG
| 19,023
| 20 May 1972
|- bgcolor="#FFFFFF"
| 
| 9.7 (61)
| 
| 18.11 (119)
| Lake Oval
| 12,421
| 20 May 1972
|- bgcolor="#FFFFFF"
| 
| 8.13 (61)
| 
| 14.12 (96)
| Arden Street Oval
| 14,091
| 20 May 1972
|- bgcolor="#FFFFFF"
| 
| 10.12 (72)
| 
| 14.15 (99)
| Moorabbin Oval
| 31,547
| 20 May 1972
|- bgcolor="#FFFFFF"
| 
| 11.25 (91)
| 
| 13.6 (84)
| VFL Park
| 25,845
| 20 May 1972

Round 9

|- bgcolor="#CCCCFF"
| Home team
| Home team score
| Away team
| Away team score
| Venue
| Crowd
| Date
|- bgcolor="#FFFFFF"
| 
| 12.9 (81)
| 
| 9.10 (64)
| Western Oval
| 15,891
| 27 May 1972
|- bgcolor="#FFFFFF"
| 
| 12.25 (97)
| 
| 16.9 (105)
| Junction Oval
| 21,753
| 27 May 1972
|- bgcolor="#FFFFFF"
| 
| 15.17 (107)
| 
| 14.21 (105)
| Windy Hill
| 28,187
| 27 May 1972
|- bgcolor="#FFFFFF"
| 
| 28.16 (184)
| 
| 16.13 (109)
| Victoria Park
| 20,771
| 27 May 1972
|- bgcolor="#FFFFFF"
| 
| 16.13 (109)
| 
| 6.11 (47)
| Princes Park
| 15,664
| 27 May 1972
|- bgcolor="#FFFFFF"
| 
| 5.6 (36)
| 
| 9.19 (73)
| VFL Park
| 23,507
| 27 May 1972

Round 10

|- bgcolor="#CCCCFF"
| Home team
| Home team score
| Away team
| Away team score
| Venue
| Crowd
| Date
|- bgcolor="#FFFFFF"
| 
| 9.11 (65)
| 
| 11.15 (81)
| Kardinia Park
| 15,835
| 3 June 1972
|- bgcolor="#FFFFFF"
| 
| 6.11 (47)
| 
| 23.17 (155)
| Arden Street Oval
| 8,063
| 3 June 1972
|- bgcolor="#FFFFFF"
| 
| 15.14 (104)
| 
| 12.14 (86)
| MCG
| 36,985
| 3 June 1972
|- bgcolor="#FFFFFF"
| 
| 8.11 (59)
| 
| 19.14 (128)
| Lake Oval
| 18,085
| 3 June 1972
|- bgcolor="#FFFFFF"
| 
| 11.22 (88)
| 
| 13.7 (85)
| Glenferrie Oval
| 26,665
| 3 June 1972
|- bgcolor="#FFFFFF"
| 
| 14.17 (101)
| 
| 15.9 (99)
| VFL Park
| 26,790
| 3 June 1972

Round 11

|- bgcolor="#CCCCFF"
| Home team
| Home team score
| Away team
| Away team score
| Venue
| Crowd
| Date
|- bgcolor="#FFFFFF"
| 
| 14.11 (95)
| 
| 2.19 (31)
| MCG
| 18,692
| 10 June 1972
|- bgcolor="#FFFFFF"
| 
| 17.8 (110)
| 
| 7.14 (56)
| Moorabbin Oval
| 24,000
| 10 June 1972
|- bgcolor="#FFFFFF"
| 
| 7.9 (51)
| 
| 7.15 (57)
| Western Oval
| 23,948
| 10 June 1972
|- bgcolor="#FFFFFF"
| 
| 12.17 (89)
| 
| 13.10 (88)
| Junction Oval
| 23,103
| 12 June 1972
|- bgcolor="#FFFFFF"
| 
| 23.10 (148)
| 
| 13.15 (93)
| Victoria Park
| 42,206
| 12 June 1972
|- bgcolor="#FFFFFF"
| 
| 14.11 (95)
| 
| 14.20 (104)
| VFL Park
| 13,945
| 12 June 1972

Round 12

|- bgcolor="#CCCCFF"
| Home team
| Home team score
| Away team
| Away team score
| Venue
| Crowd
| Date
|- bgcolor="#FFFFFF"
| 
| 7.8 (50)
| 
| 12.19 (91)
| Arden Street Oval
| 10,681
| 17 June 1972
|- bgcolor="#FFFFFF"
| 
| 11.24 (90)
| 
| 12.13 (85)
| Victoria Park
| 28,188
| 17 June 1972
|- bgcolor="#FFFFFF"
| 
| 11.10 (76)
| 
| 11.9 (75)
| MCG
| 31,314
| 17 June 1972
|- bgcolor="#FFFFFF"
| 
| 15.14 (104)
| 
| 10.13 (73)
| Kardinia Park
| 14,426
| 24 June 1972
|- bgcolor="#FFFFFF"
| 
| 14.15 (99)
| 
| 19.19 (133)
| Windy Hill
| 23,903
| 24 June 1972
|- bgcolor="#FFFFFF"
| 
| 8.7 (55)
| 
| 13.13 (91)
| VFL Park
| 29,380
| 24 June 1972

Round 13

|- bgcolor="#CCCCFF"
| Home team
| Home team score
| Away team
| Away team score
| Venue
| Crowd
| Date
|- bgcolor="#FFFFFF"
| 
| 21.14 (140)
| 
| 10.16 (76)
| Glenferrie Oval
| 8,201
| 1 July 1972
|- bgcolor="#FFFFFF"
| 
| 10.10 (70)
| 
| 9.8 (62)
| Princes Park
| 36,133
| 1 July 1972
|- bgcolor="#FFFFFF"
| 
| 14.8 (92)
| 
| 25.18 (168)
| MCG
| 22,595
| 1 July 1972
|- bgcolor="#FFFFFF"
| 
| 13.10 (88)
| 
| 6.17 (53)
| Moorabbin Oval
| 18,355
| 1 July 1972
|- bgcolor="#FFFFFF"
| 
| 12.12 (84)
| 
| 13.9 (87)
| Lake Oval
| 12,984
| 1 July 1972
|- bgcolor="#FFFFFF"
| 
| 11.8 (74)
| 
| 16.15 (111)
| VFL Park
| 14,180
| 1 July 1972

Round 14

|- bgcolor="#CCCCFF"
| Home team
| Home team score
| Away team
| Away team score
| Venue
| Crowd
| Date
|- bgcolor="#FFFFFF"
| 
| 10.9 (69)
| 
| 14.9 (93)
| Lake Oval
| 10,405
| 8 July 1972
|- bgcolor="#FFFFFF"
| 
| 8.15 (63)
| 
| 14.15 (99)
| Arden Street Oval
| 9,302
| 8 July 1972
|- bgcolor="#FFFFFF"
| 
| 10.10 (70)
| 
| 9.6 (60)
| Kardinia Park
| 23,873
| 8 July 1972
|- bgcolor="#FFFFFF"
| 
| 4.13 (37)
| 
| 9.13 (67)
| Moorabbin Oval
| 30,451
| 8 July 1972
|- bgcolor="#FFFFFF"
| 
| 17.17 (119)
| 
| 13.10 (88)
| MCG
| 46,471
| 8 July 1972
|- bgcolor="#FFFFFF"
| 
| 19.19 (133)
| 
| 12.8 (80)
| VFL Park
| 12,425
| 8 July 1972

Round 15

|- bgcolor="#CCCCFF"
| Home team
| Home team score
| Away team
| Away team score
| Venue
| Crowd
| Date
|- bgcolor="#FFFFFF"
| 
| 14.7 (91)
| 
| 9.11 (65)
| Western Oval
| 18,655
| 15 July 1972
|- bgcolor="#FFFFFF"
| 
| 16.14 (110)
| 
| 9.12 (66)
| Junction Oval
| 7,007
| 15 July 1972
|- bgcolor="#FFFFFF"
| 
| 13.12 (90)
| 
| 17.9 (111)
| Windy Hill
| 22,251
| 15 July 1972
|- bgcolor="#FFFFFF"
| 
| 20.8 (128)
| 
| 8.15 (63)
| Princes Park
| 14,465
| 15 July 1972
|- bgcolor="#FFFFFF"
| 
| 19.14 (128)
| 
| 15.8 (98)
| Glenferrie Oval
| 12,425
| 15 July 1972
|- bgcolor="#FFFFFF"
| 
| 8.10 (58)
| 
| 10.13 (73)
| VFL Park
| 30,883
| 15 July 1972

Round 16

|- bgcolor="#CCCCFF"
| Home team
| Home team score
| Away team
| Away team score
| Venue
| Crowd
| Date
|- bgcolor="#FFFFFF"
| 
| 11.18 (84)
| 
| 19.9 (123)
| MCG
| 32,416
| 22 July 1972
|- bgcolor="#FFFFFF"
| 
| 13.11 (89)
| 
| 19.16 (130)
| Western Oval
| 18,400
| 22 July 1972
|- bgcolor="#FFFFFF"
| 
| 10.9 (69)
| 
| 12.13 (85)
| Junction Oval
| 11,046
| 22 July 1972
|- bgcolor="#FFFFFF"
| 
| 17.6 (108)
| 
| 11.14 (80)
| Victoria Park
| 18,049
| 22 July 1972
|- bgcolor="#FFFFFF"
| 
| 20.13 (133)
| 
| 17.15 (117)
| Princes Park
| 26,206
| 22 July 1972
|- bgcolor="#FFFFFF"
| 
| 14.11 (95)
| 
| 9.5 (59)
| VFL Park
| 13,184
| 22 July 1972

Round 17

|- bgcolor="#CCCCFF"
| Home team
| Home team score
| Away team
| Away team score
| Venue
| Crowd
| Date
|- bgcolor="#FFFFFF"
| 
| 23.15 (153)
| 
| 11.15 (81)
| MCG
| 44,348
| 29 July 1972
|- bgcolor="#FFFFFF"
| 
| 12.15 (87)
| 
| 11.12 (78)
| Arden Street Oval
| 6,191
| 29 July 1972
|- bgcolor="#FFFFFF"
| 
| 21.14 (140)
| 
| 14.11 (95)
| Windy Hill
| 16,318
| 29 July 1972
|- bgcolor="#FFFFFF"
| 
| 11.16 (82)
| 
| 19.13 (127)
| Glenferrie Oval
| 24,135
| 29 July 1972
|- bgcolor="#FFFFFF"
| 
| 9.13 (67)
| 
| 17.17 (119)
| Kardinia Park
| 24,797
| 29 July 1972
|- bgcolor="#FFFFFF"
| 
| 15.12 (102)
| 
| 11.15 (81)
| VFL Park
| 9,750
| 29 July 1972

Round 18

|- bgcolor="#CCCCFF"
| Home team
| Home team score
| Away team
| Away team score
| Venue
| Crowd
| Date
|- bgcolor="#FFFFFF"
| 
| 9.19 (73)
| 
| 10.9 (69)
| Western Oval
| 14,699
| 5 August 1972
|- bgcolor="#FFFFFF"
| 
| 19.15 (129)
| 
| 12.13 (85)
| Victoria Park
| 25,007
| 5 August 1972
|- bgcolor="#FFFFFF"
| 
| 13.11 (89)
| 
| 23.10 (148)
| Lake Oval
| 9,207
| 5 August 1972
|- bgcolor="#FFFFFF"
| 
| 12.9 (81)
| 
| 12.16 (88)
| Moorabbin Oval
| 29,062
| 5 August 1972
|- bgcolor="#FFFFFF"
| 
| 8.18 (66)
| 
| 11.11 (77)
| MCG
| 33,364
| 5 August 1972
|- bgcolor="#FFFFFF"
| 
| 6.14 (50)
| 
| 13.20 (98)
| VFL Park
| 11,393
| 5 August 1972

Round 19

|- bgcolor="#CCCCFF"
| Home team
| Home team score
| Away team
| Away team score
| Venue
| Crowd
| Date
|- bgcolor="#FFFFFF"
| 
| 15.12 (102)
| 
| 17.11 (113)
| Glenferrie Oval
| 18,103
| 12 August 1972
|- bgcolor="#FFFFFF"
| 
| 11.19 (85)
| 
| 21.16 (142)
| Kardinia Park
| 12,716
| 12 August 1972
|- bgcolor="#FFFFFF"
| 
| 14.14 (98)
| 
| 6.17 (53)
| Junction Oval
| 7,451
| 12 August 1972
|- bgcolor="#FFFFFF"
| 
| 21.14 (140)
| 
| 14.11 (95)
| Windy Hill
| 14,454
| 12 August 1972
|- bgcolor="#FFFFFF"
| 
| 13.16 (94)
| 
| 10.11 (71)
| Princes Park
| 22,109
| 12 August 1972
|- bgcolor="#FFFFFF"
| 
| 7.13 (55)
| 
| 15.12 (102)
| VFL Park
| 21,540
| 12 August 1972

Round 20

|- bgcolor="#CCCCFF"
| Home team
| Home team score
| Away team
| Away team score
| Venue
| Crowd
| Date
|- bgcolor="#FFFFFF"
| 
| 13.12 (90)
| 
| 13.11 (89)
| Moorabbin Oval
| 18,836
| 19 August 1972
|- bgcolor="#FFFFFF"
| 
| 9.12 (66)
| 
| 11.13 (79)
| Lake Oval
| 9,154
| 19 August 1972
|- bgcolor="#FFFFFF"
| 
| 20.17 (137)
| 
| 13.22 (100)
| MCG
| 27,651
| 19 August 1972
|- bgcolor="#FFFFFF"
| 
| 17.10 (112)
| 
| 17.9 (111)
| Kardinia Park
| 23,108
| 19 August 1972
|- bgcolor="#FFFFFF"
| 
| 8.12 (60)
| 
| 23.11 (149)
| Arden Street Oval
| 11,271
| 19 August 1972
|- bgcolor="#FFFFFF"
| 
| 15.16 (106)
| 
| 12.15 (87)
| VFL Park
| 36,749
| 19 August 1972

Round 21

|- bgcolor="#CCCCFF"
| Home team
| Home team score
| Away team
| Away team score
| Venue
| Crowd
| Date
|- bgcolor="#FFFFFF"
| 
| 17.22 (124)
| 
| 14.7 (91)
| MCG
| 11,241
| 26 August 1972
|- bgcolor="#FFFFFF"
| 
| 17.21 (123)
| 
| 18.17 (125)
| Western Oval
| 18,117
| 26 August 1972
|- bgcolor="#FFFFFF"
| 
| 22.17 (149)
| 
| 11.6 (72)
| Victoria Park
| 19,934
| 26 August 1972
|- bgcolor="#FFFFFF"
| 
| 24.12 (156)
| 
| 11.22 (88)
| Princes Park
| 32,048
| 26 August 1972
|- bgcolor="#FFFFFF"
| 
| 14.20 (104)
| 
| 18.11 (119)
| Junction Oval
| 17,252
| 26 August 1972
|- bgcolor="#FFFFFF"
| 
| 11.10 (76)
| 
| 8.13 (61)
| VFL Park
| 25,663
| 26 August 1972

Round 22

|- bgcolor="#CCCCFF"
| Home team
| Home team score
| Away team
| Away team score
| Venue
| Crowd
| Date
|- bgcolor="#FFFFFF"
| 
| 15.12 (102)
| 
| 18.13 (121)
| Glenferrie Oval
| 22,855
| 2 September 1972
|- bgcolor="#FFFFFF"
| 
| 20.20 (140)
| 
| 13.11 (89)
| Kardinia Park
| 12,267
| 2 September 1972
|- bgcolor="#FFFFFF"
| 
| 13.8 (86)
| 
| 11.17 (83)
| Princes Park
| 24,619
| 2 September 1972
|- bgcolor="#FFFFFF"
| 
| 18.19 (127)
| 
| 14.11 (95)
| MCG
| 21,653
| 2 September 1972
|- bgcolor="#FFFFFF"
| 
| 17.15 (117)
| 
| 17.10 (112)
| Windy Hill
| 35,030
| 2 September 1972
|- bgcolor="#FFFFFF"
| 
| 12.10 (82)
| 
| 23.20 (158)
| VFL Park
| 16,541
| 2 September 1972

Ladder

Finals

Elimination final

|- bgcolor="#CCCCFF"
| Home team
| Score
| Away team
| Score
| Venue
| Crowd
| Date
|- bgcolor="#FFFFFF"
| 
| 18.16 (124)
| 
| 10.11 (71)
| VFL Park
| 52,499
| 9 September

Qualifying final

|- bgcolor="#CCCCFF"
| Home team
| Score
| Away team
| Score
| Venue
| Crowd
| Date
|- bgcolor="#FFFFFF"
| 
| 25.14 (164)
| 
| 18.12 (120)
| MCG
| 91,900
| 9 September
|- bgcolor="#FFFFFF"

Semi-finals

|- bgcolor="#CCCCFF"
| Home team
| Score
| Away team
| Score
| Venue
| Crowd
| Date
|- bgcolor="#FFFFFF"
| 
| 8.17 (65)
| 
| 11.17 (83)
| MCG
| 91,857
| 16 September
|- bgcolor="#FFFFFF"
| 
| 8.13 (61)
| 
| 8.13 (61)
| VFL Park
| 54,338
| 16 September
|- bgcolor="#FFFFFF"
| 
| 9.15 (69)
| 
| 15.20 (110)
| MCG
| 92,670
| 23 September

Preliminary final

|- bgcolor="#CCCCFF"
| Home team
| Score
| Away team
| Score
| Venue
| Crowd
| Date
|- bgcolor="#FFFFFF"
| 
| 16.13 (109)
| 
| 13.15 (93)
| MCG
| 96,272
| 30 September

Grand final

Carlton defeated Richmond 28.9 (177) to 22.18 (150) in front of a crowd of 112,393 people. (For an explanation of scoring, see here.)

Awards
 The 1972 VFL Premiership team was Carlton.
 The VFL's leading goalkicker was Peter McKenna of Collingwood who kicked 130 goals.
 The winner of the 1972 Brownlow Medal was Len Thompson of Collingwood with 25 votes.
 North Melbourne took the "wooden spoon" in 1972. The club would not "win" another wooden spoon again until 2021, forty-nine years later.
Hawthorn 13.10 (88) defeated  12.12 (84) in the grand final, held as a curtain-raiser to the seniors Grand Final at the Melbourne Cricket Ground on 7 October.

Notable events
 The Page–McIntyre system for determining the VFL premiership team, that had been centered on a final four, and had operated from 1931 to 1971, was replaced by the McIntyre final five system in 1972 (the new finals system operated from 1972 until the 1991 AFL season, when it was replaced by the first McIntyre final six system).
 In Round 1, Hawthorn full-forward Peter Hudson kicked 8 goals at Glenferrie Oval before he sustained a knee injury that kept him out until Round 21 of the following season.
 In Round 10, the VFL changed a tradition: the field umpire, rather than team captains, tossed the coin at the start of the match, in order to reduce gamesmanship.
 In Round 14, Collingwood half-forward John Greening was felled by St Kilda back-man Jim O'Dea 70 metres behind play. Greening was comatose for some time and was extremely lucky not to have died. After a VFL investigation, O'Dea received a 10-week suspension, which was seen by some as unsatisfactory.
 In the second quarter of Carlton's Round 16 match against Essendon, Alex Jesaulenko kicked six goals in eleven minutes. Carlton kicked 11 goals straight in that second quarter.
 In August, the VFL announced that it would grant a free transfer to any player who had played 10 years with a single club.
The "10-year rule" was introduced in order to render the VFL immune from the sorts of "restraint of trade" difficulties that were being experienced, at the time, in New South Wales in relation to Rugby League footballers.
Although twenty-two VFL players were eligible to do so, only six players, George Bisset (Footscray to Collingwood), Barry Davis (Essendon to North Melbourne), Carl Ditterich (St Kilda to Melbourne), Adrian Gallagher (Carlton to Footscray), John Rantall (South Melbourne to North Melbourne), and Doug Wade (Geelong to North Melbourne) took advantage of the new rule. The rule was rescinded in May 1973.
 In September, North Melbourne Football Club appointed Ron Barassi as its 1973 coach.
 In Round 20, Geelong's Ken Newland kicked a behind after the siren to win the match against Collingwood.
 In the Round 21 match between Fitzroy and Essendon at the Junction Oval, bespectacled Essendon full-forward Geoff Blethyn kicked his 100th goal. A mounted policeman galloped out to protect Blethyn from spectators, and Blethyn was temporarily rendered sightless when the policeman's horse slobbered all over his glasses.
 The 16 September First semi-final between Richmond and Carlton was tied at 8.13 (61) each. Angry fans invaded VFL Park immediately after the siren and field umpire Ian Coates was assaulted.
 The Grand Final between Carlton and Richmond featured an aggregate score of 50.27 (327), setting the record for the highest aggregate score in any game, final or otherwise. The previous record of 48.25 (313) had stood since 1942, and the record would last until 1978.

Footnotes

References
 Hogan, P., The Tigers of Old, The Richmond Football Club, (Richmond), 1996. 
 Maplestone, M., Flying Higher: History of the Essendon Football Club 1872–1996, Essendon Football Club, (Melbourne), 1996. 
 Rogers, S. & Brown, A., Every Game Ever Played: VFL/AFL Results 1897–1997 (Sixth Edition), Viking Books, (Ringwood), 1998. 
 Ross, J. (ed), 100 Years of Australian Football 1897–1996: The Complete Story of the AFL, All the Big Stories, All the Great Pictures, All the Champions, Every AFL Season Reported, Viking, (Ringwood), 1996.

External links
 1972 Season – AFL Tables

Australian Football League seasons
Season